"Freunde" (Friends) is a song by Die Toten Hosen. It's the fourth single and the twelfth track from the album Zurück zum Glück.

The song is a hymn and an ode to friendship overall.

Music video
The music video was directed by Sven Bollinger. It shows the band walking to an empty office building, where they then perform the song. In between photos of friends are shown.

Track listing
 "Freunde" (Frege, von Holst/Frege) − 3:11
 "Irgendjemand, nur nicht ich" (Somebody, just not me) (von Holst/Frege) - 3:07
 "The Guns of Brixton" (Paul Simonon/Simonon) - 3:00 (The Clash cover)

Charts

2005 singles
Die Toten Hosen songs
Songs written by Campino (singer)
Songs written by Andreas von Holst
2005 songs